Ivana Janečková (born March 8, 1984, in Rychnov nad Kněžnou) is a Czech cross-country skier who competed between 2002 and 2012.  Her best finish at the FIS Nordic World Ski Championships was fifth in the 4 × 5 km relay at Sapporo in 2007 while her best individual finish was 21st in the 30 km event at those same championships.

Janečková's best individual finish at the Winter Olympics was 23rd in 7.5 km + 7.5 km double pursuit at Turin in 2006.

Her best individual World Cup finish was 22nd in a 15 km event in France in 2006.

Cross-country skiing results
All results are sourced from the International Ski Federation (FIS).

Olympic Games

World Championships

World Cup

Season standings

Team podiums

1  podium – (1 )

References

External links

1984 births
Cross-country skiers at the 2006 Winter Olympics
Cross-country skiers at the 2010 Winter Olympics
Czech female cross-country skiers
Living people
Olympic cross-country skiers of the Czech Republic
People from Rychnov nad Kněžnou
Sportspeople from the Hradec Králové Region